Stuart Corsar (born 28 March 1984 in Inverurie, Scotland) is a former rugby union player for Glasgow Warriors at the Loosehead Prop position.

Corsar was a member of Glasgow Warriors Elite Development Players (Academy squad) was promoted to a full-time professional contract in 2006.

He then moved to England to play with the Rotherham Titans.

From there he moved on to play for the Doncaster Knights.

Corsar was capped by Scotland at various age grades and finally earned a Scotland 'A' cap.

After concussion forced him to quit playing, he moved into coaching, first with Aberdeen GSFP before moving onto coach Garioch RFC, his first amateur club. Left in 2017.

External links 

Trend magazine Profile

The Herald Profile
ESPN Profile
STV news on Aberdeen GSFP

References 

Living people
Glasgow Warriors players
1984 births
Garioch RFC players
Aberdeen GSFP RFC players
Doncaster R.F.C. players
Rotherham Titans players
Scotland 'A' international rugby union players
Rugby union props
Rugby union players from Aberdeenshire